The Suzuki GN250 is a 4-valve single cylinder, air-cooled SOHC, 4 stroke standard motorcycle made by Suzuki Motors from 1982 to 1997. Its smaller cousin is known as GN125 with a smaller displacement (125cc) engine (production ended in 2021). GN250 is a cruiser-like street oriented popular learner's bike. There was also the GN400, on the UK market between 1982 and 1984, which unusually used a 6-volt electric system.

Instrumentation includes a speedometer, odometer with trip, high beam, turn indicators, and a gear position indicator. For later versions, the engine automatically shuts off if the bike is put into gear when side stand is down. The Suzuki GZ250 is a more cruiser-oriented version of GN250 in terms of dimensions with same drivetrain. Suzuki TU250 is a modern evolution of this bike with EFI and different styling.

Specifications 

 Overall Length: 2,030 mm (79.9 in)
 Overall Width: 840 mm (33.1 in)
 Overall Height: 1,120 mm (44.1 in)
 Wheelbase: 1,350 mm (53.1 in)
 Dry Weight: 128 kg (281 lbs)

Engines

References

GN250
Standard motorcycles